Jilin People's Stadium is a multi-purpose stadium in Jilin, China.  It is currently used mostly for football matches.  The stadium holds 25,000.

See also
 Sports in China

Sports venues in Jilin
Football venues in China
Multi-purpose stadiums in China